Taiwan Golden Bee (TGB) is a Taiwanese manufacturer of scooters, and all-terrain vehicles. The company was established by Chi-Fu Chang, who had previously run the Taiwanese division of Vespa and applied the manufacturing techniques from this to TGB.

The company was established in 1978 based on Piaggio technology for the production of Vespa scooter components. TGB also manufactures continuously variable transmissions for Piaggio, Rotax, Peugeot Motocycles, Minarelli, Morini, Polaris and SYM.

See also
 List of companies of Taiwan
 List of Taiwanese automakers
 Automotive industry in Taiwan

References

External links 

1978 establishments in Taiwan
Manufacturing companies based in Kaohsiung
Scooter manufacturers
Taiwanese brands
Vehicle manufacturing companies established in 1978